Plicagonum is a genus of ground beetles in the family Carabidae. There are at least three described species in Plicagonum, found in Indonesia and Papua New Guinea.

Species
These three species belong to the genus Plicagonum:
 Plicagonum fulvum Darlington, 1952
 Plicagonum kaindi Darlington, 1971
 Plicagonum rugifrons Darlington, 1952

References

Platyninae